The Aeolus Yixuan GS is a compact crossover station wagon based on the Aeolus Yixuan compact sedan produced by Dongfeng Motor Corporation under the Aeolus sub-brand.

Overview

Essentially the station wagon version of the Aeolus Yixuan, the Aeolus Yixuan GS debuted in May 2020, and was known as the Yixuan RV during development phase. The Yixuan GS is being listed with a price range of 82,900 yuan to 101,900 yuan.

The engine options of the Aeolus Yixuan GS includes a 1.0-litre inline-three gasoline turbo engine mated to a 5-speed manual gearbox and a 1.5-litre inline-four turbocharged petrol engine mated to either a 5-speed manual gearbox or a 6-speed dual clutch transmission. The Aeolus Yixuan GS features a torsion beam type non-independent suspension.

Technical configurations is the same as the Yixuan sedan including a Level-2 autonomous driving assistance system is also available on the Aeolus Yixuan, supporting functions such as automatic parking, forward collision warning, automatic brake assistance, adaptive cruise control, lane keeping assistance, traffic signal recognition, and intelligent speed limit reminder. The Yixuan will also be equipped with a 7-inch LCD instrument and a 10-inch center console display.

Engines

References

External links 
 Aeolus Official Website

Aeolus Yixuan GS
Compact cars
Cars introduced in 2020
Front-wheel-drive vehicles
Station wagons
Cars of China